Solferino is a town in Italy. Solférino is a town in France.

Solferino or Solférino may also refer to:
 Battle of Solferino, final battle of the Second Italian War of Independence
 French ironclad Solférino, Magenta-class ironclad ship built for the French Navy
 Solferino, Quintana Roo, a town in Mexico
 Solférino (Paris Métro), a station on line 12 of the Paris Métro
 Solférino, a suburb of Vacoas-Phoenix, Mauritius

See also 
 Sofrino